Peltophorum pterocarpum (commonly known as copperpod, yellow-flamboyant, yellow flametree, yellow poinciana or yellow-flame) is a species of Peltophorum, native to tropical southeastern Asia and a popular ornamental tree grown around the world.

Description

It is a deciduous tree growing to 15–25 m (rarely up to 50 m) tall, with a trunk diameter of up to 1 m belonging to Family Leguminosae and sub-family Caesalpiniaceaea. The leaves are bipinnate, 30–60 cm long, with 16–20 pinnae, each pinna with 20–40 oval leaflets 8–25 mm long and 4–10 mm broad. The flowers are yellow, 2.5–4 cm diameter, produced in large compound raceme up to 20 cm long. Pollens are approximately 50 microns in size.  

The fruit is a pod 5–10 cm long and 2.5 cm broad, red at first, ripening black, and containing one to four seeds. Trees begin to flower after about four years.

Distribution

Peltophorum pterocarpum is native to tropical southeast Asia and northern Australasia, in: Australia (including islands off the Northern Territory coast), Sri Lanka, Indonesia, Malaysia, Papua New Guinea, Philippines, Thailand and Vietnam (where it is called Lim xẹt). It is also found in India.

Uses
The tree  is widely grown in tropical regions as an ornamental tree, particularly in India, Nigeria, Pakistan, and Florida and Hawaii in the United States. Used as decorating flower in Telangana State's Batukamma festival. The trees have been planted alternately in India as a common scheme for avenue trees in India alternately with Delonix regia (Poinciana) to give a striking yellow and red effect in summer, as has been done on Hughes road in Mumbai.

The wood has a wide variety of uses, including cabinet-making and the foliage is used as a fodder crop. The brownish colour called sogan typical of batik cloth from inland Java in Indonesia is produced from P. pterocarpum, which is known there as soga.

References 

pterocarpum
Trees of Malesia
Flora of the Northern Territory
Trees of New Guinea
Trees of Sri Lanka
Trees of Thailand
Trees of Vietnam
Fabales of Asia